Tuorla may refer to:

 Tuorla, Finland
 1425 Tuorla, an asteroid named for it